In geometry, the grand stellated  120-cell or grand stellated polydodecahedron is a regular star 4-polytope with Schläfli symbol {5/2,5,5/2}. It is one of 10 regular Schläfli-Hess polytopes.
It is also one of two such polytopes that is self-dual.

Related polytopes 

It has the same edge arrangement as the grand 600-cell, icosahedral 120-cell, and the same face arrangement as the great stellated 120-cell.

Due to its self-duality, it does not have a good three-dimensional analogue, but (like all other star polyhedra and polychora) is analogous to the two-dimensional pentagram.

See also 
 List of regular polytopes
 Convex regular 4-polytope
 Kepler-Poinsot solids - regular star polyhedron
 Star polygon - regular star polygons

References 
 Edmund Hess, (1883) Einleitung in die Lehre von der Kugelteilung mit besonderer Berücksichtigung ihrer Anwendung auf die Theorie der Gleichflächigen und der gleicheckigen Polyeder .
H. S. M. Coxeter, Regular Polytopes, 3rd. ed., Dover Publications, 1973. .
 John H. Conway, Heidi Burgiel, Chaim Goodman-Strass, The Symmetries of Things 2008,  (Chapter 26, Regular Star-polytopes, pp. 404–408)

External links 
 Regular polychora 
 Discussion on names
 Reguläre Polytope
 The Regular Star Polychora

4-polytopes